Datta Raghobaji Meghe (born 11 November 1936) is an Indian politician and currently a leader of the Bharatiya Janata Party. He was elected to Lok Sabha as a member of Congress Party four times : 10th Lok Sabha from Nagpur, 11th (1996-1998) from Ramtek, 12th Lok Sabha from Wardha, and 15th Lok Sabha (2009-2014) from Wardha constituency in Maharashtra state.

He was a Member of the Rajya Sabha, the upper house of the Indian Parliament, representing Maharashtra, from April 2002 – 2008.

Earlier he was Member of Legislative Council of Maharashtra from April 1978 to June 1991 for three times and also during 2001-April 2002.

The Meghe Group
Apart from Politics, Datta Meghe has established a chain of CBSE Schools, Medical Colleges, Engineering Colleges, Hospitals, Banks,  Spinning mills, IT firms in urban & especially rural areas to provide the best of facilities at extremely affordable rates.

References

External links
 Profile on Rajya Sabha website
 Profile on Lok Sabha website

Indian National Congress politicians
Rajya Sabha members from Maharashtra
India MPs 1991–1996
India MPs 1996–1997
India MPs 1998–1999
India MPs 2009–2014
Members of the Maharashtra Legislative Council
Marathi politicians
1936 births
Living people
Lok Sabha members from Maharashtra
People from Nagpur district
People from Wardha district
Leaders of the Opposition in the Maharashtra Legislative Council
Bharatiya Janata Party politicians from Maharashtra
Indian Congress (Socialist) politicians